In statistics, a latent class model (LCM) relates a set of observed (usually discrete) multivariate variables to a set of latent variables. It is a type of latent variable model. It is called a latent class model because the latent variable is discrete. A class is characterized by a pattern of conditional probabilities that indicate the chance that variables take on certain values.

Latent class analysis (LCA) is a subset of structural equation modeling, used to find groups or subtypes of cases in multivariate categorical data. These subtypes are called "latent classes".

Confronted with a situation as follows, a researcher might choose to use LCA to understand the data: Imagine that symptoms a-d have been measured in a range of patients with diseases X, Y, and Z, and that disease X is associated with the presence of symptoms a, b, and c, disease Y with symptoms b, c, d, and disease Z with symptoms a, c and d.

The LCA will attempt to detect the presence of latent classes (the disease entities), creating patterns of association in the symptoms. As in factor analysis, the LCA can also be used to classify case according to their maximum likelihood class membership.

Because the criterion for solving the LCA is to achieve latent classes within which there is no longer any association of one symptom with another (because the class is the disease which causes their association), and the set of diseases a patient has (or class a case is a member of) causes the symptom association, the symptoms will be "conditionally independent", i.e., conditional on class membership, they are no longer related.

Model 
Within each latent class, the observed variables are statistically independent. This is an important aspect. Usually the observed variables are statistically dependent. By introducing the latent variable, independence is restored in the sense that within classes variables are independent (local independence). We then say that the association between the observed variables is explained by the classes of the latent variable (McCutcheon, 1987).

In one form, the latent class model is written as
  
or unconditional probabilities that should sum to one.  are the
marginal or conditional probabilities.

For a two-way latent class model, the form is
 
This two-way model is related to probabilistic latent semantic analysis and non-negative matrix factorization.

Related methods 
There are a number of methods with distinct names and uses that share a common relationship. Cluster analysis is, like LCA, used to discover taxon-like groups of cases in data. Multivariate mixture estimation (MME) is applicable to continuous data, and assumes that such data arise from a mixture of distributions: imagine a set of heights arising from a mixture of men and women. If a multivariate mixture estimation is constrained so that measures must be uncorrelated within each distribution, it is termed latent profile analysis. Modified to handle discrete data, this constrained analysis is known as LCA. Discrete latent trait models further constrain the classes to form from segments of a single dimension: essentially allocating members to classes on that dimension: an example would be assigning cases to social classes on a dimension of ability or merit.

As a practical instance, the variables could be multiple choice items of a political questionnaire. The data in this case consists of a N-way contingency table with answers to the items for a number of respondents. In this example, the latent variable refers to political opinion and the latent classes to political groups. Given group membership, the conditional probabilities specify the chance certain answers are chosen.

Application 
LCA may be used in many fields, such as: collaborative filtering, Behavior Genetics and Evaluation of diagnostic tests.

References

External links
 Statistical Innovations, Home Page, 2016. Website with latent class software (Latent GOLD 5.1), free demonstrations, tutorials, user guides, and publications for download. Also included: online courses, FAQs, and other related software.
 The Methodology Center, Latent Class Analysis, a research center at Penn State, free software, FAQ
 John Uebersax, Latent Class Analysis, 2006. A web-site with bibliography, software, links and FAQ for latent class analysis

Classification algorithms
Latent variable models
Market research
Market segmentation